Gojko Arneri (29 August 1935 – 23 February 1983) was a Yugoslav swimmer. He competed in the men's 100 metre freestyle at the 1960 Summer Olympics.

References

1935 births
1983 deaths
Sportspeople from Požarevac
Serbian male swimmers
Yugoslav male swimmers
Olympic swimmers of Yugoslavia
Swimmers at the 1960 Summer Olympics